List of ghost towns in Croatia contains towns and villages in Croatia which have no inhabitants.

A

 Amatovci
 Antovo

B

 Babin Potok
 Bačev Do
 Bačići
 Bačuga
 Bačun
 Bagalovići
 Baići
 Banki
 Banovo Selo
 Banja
 Barci
 Baretići
 Bašići
 Bašunje Male
 Bašunje Vele
 Bazje Novo
 Belobrajići
 Beloglavski Breg
 Belušići
 Benići
 Benići
 Benići Drivenički
 Benkovec
 Benkovići
 Benleva
 Bezjaki
 Bistrac
 Biškupec
 Bjelovac
 Bjeljevina
 Bjeljevine
 Blaškovići
 Blažani
 Blaževdol Psarjevački
 Blažići
 Blažići
 Blažići 
 Bobići
 Bokanjac
 Bolfan Mali
 Bolfan Veliki
 Borje Lepoglavsko
 Borki
 Borojevci
 Brajinska
 Brda
 Brdo
 Breg Martinovski
 Brestje
 Breznica Klokočevačka
 Brezovci
 Brezovec Donji
 Brezovec Gornji
 Brezovo Polje Lukačko
 Brig
 Brnasi
 Bršljanica
 Brunkovac
 Brzaja
 Bučica
 Budainka
 Budići
 Budim
 Bukovac Visućki
 Bukovec
 Bukovec
 Bunje 
 Burijaki

C

Caprag
Carevo Brdo
Cargnelli Villa
Cenkovec
Cerje
Cernička Mala
Cerovica
Cerovići
Ciganjšćak
Cista Griva
Cista Griva
Cjepidlake
Colnari
Crkvena Ves
Crna Mlaka
Crnac Jezeranski
Crni Dabar
Crni Lug Glinski
Crni Zatonj
Crnogovci
Cvetišće

Č

Čaglić
Čaklovac
Čamparovica
Čandrli
Čarapi
Čehi
Čemernica
Čenkovo
Čerišnjevica
Češko Selo
Čret
Črnomerec
Čučerje
Čugovec
Čuleti
Čulinec
Čulišić

D

Dajčići
Dankovec
Debelo Brdo
Dedići
Degidovec
Deriguz
Desna Luka
Dešćevec
Dijebala
Dijelka
Diklo
Dirakovica
Dobretin
Dobrica
Dobrova
Dolac Crikvenički
Dolanec
Dolčani
Dolec
Dolinci
Dolinci
Doluš
Doljani Zrmanjski
Dolje
Dolje Podsusedsko
Domjani
Donja Batina
Donja Bedekovčina
Donja Bedekovčina
Donja Begovača
Donja Buzeta
Donja Dabrina
Donja Kamenica
Donja Klada
Donja Lepoglava
Donja Lovča
Donja Lučelnica
Donja Međa
Donja Ploča
Donja Subocka
Donja Svedruža
Donja Svedruža
Donja Švica
Donja Tijarica
Donje Bilišane
Donje Čelo
Donje Jošane
Donje Oroslavje
Donje Oroslavje
Donje Polonje
Donje Prugovo
Donje Rašćane
Donje Selište
Donje Selo
Donje Selo
Donje Škurinje
Donje Vrapče
Donje Vratno
Donji Baćin
Donji Brestovec
Donji Brestovec
Donji Bukovec
Donji Dežanovac
Donji Doljani
Donji Ervenik
Donji Frkašić
Donji Gračec
Donji Kirin
Donji Labusi
Donji Lukavec
Donji Majkovi
Donji Markuševec
Donji Praputnik
Donji Pribić
Donji Prozor
Donji Radošić
Donji Rajić
Donji Rukavac
Donji Sinac 
Donji Sroki
Donji Starigrad
Donji Zaklopca
Došen Dabar
Došen Duliba
Dovičići
Dračevac Zadarski
Draga
Draga
Draga Crikvenička
Dragaljin
Draganec
Dragičevci
Dragičevići
Dragodid
Dragonožec Gornji
Dragonožec Donji
Dragovine
Dravski Kuti
Draženovići
Dražine
Drenova
Drenovac Brinjski
Drenovac Radučki
Drivenik-stanica
Dubrava Farkašićka
Dubrava
Dubrava
Dubrava Krmpotska
Dubrava Markuševečka
Dugi Dol Vrhovinski (1 household as at 2020)
Dumenčići
Dvorišće
Dvorska

F

Fontana
Frančići
Franovići
Frateršćica
Frlanija
Funčići

G

Gajišće
Gakovo
Galdovo
Galdovo Erdedsko
Garići
Gerovski Kraj
Gerovski Kraj
Glavica
Glavice
Glavnica
Glogovec Zaprudski
Glogovnica
Gljuščići
Gojlo Kutinsko
Goleši
Goliki
Golomičari
Goljak
Gorenci
Gorenja Vas
Gorica
Gorica Lepoglavska
Goričica
Goričine
Gornja Bedekovčina
Gornja Bedekovčina
Gornja Begovača
Gornja Budičina
Gornja Bukovica
Gornja Buzeta
Gornja Dabrina
Gornja Kamenica
Gornja Kustošija
Gornja Lovča
Gornja Lučelnica
Gornja Mala
Gornja Međa
Gornja Subocka
Gornja Svedruža
Gornja Svedruža
Gornja Šuma
Gornja Švica
Gornja Tijarica
Gornja Župa
Gornjak
Gornje Čelo
Gornje Jelenje
Gornje Jošane 
Gornje Oroslavlje
Gornje Oroslavje
Gornje Pazarište
Gornje Polonje
Gornje Prugovo
Gornje Rašćane
Gornje Selo
Gornje Selo
Gornje Vino
Gornje Vino
Gornje Vrapče
Gornji Baćin
Gornji Brestovec
Gornji Brestovec 
Gornji Bukovec
Gornji Cerovci
Gornji Dežanovac
Gornji Doljani
Gornji Ervenik
Gornji Gečkovec
Gornji Gračec
Gornji Jugi
Gornji Kirin
Gornji Kolarec
Gornji Labusi
Gornji Lukavec
Gornji Majkovi
Gornji Markuševec
Gornji Mekinjar
Gornji Poloj
Gornji Praputnik
Gornji Prozor
Gornji Pustakovec
Gornji Rabac
Gornji Rajić
Gornji Rukavac
Gornji Sinac
Gornji Stenjevec
Gornji Šarampov
Gornji Šarampov
Gornji Tiškovac
Gornji Vidovec
Gornji Zaklopac
Gorske Mokrice
Gostovo Polje
Grabar Prokički
Grabarak
Grabovac Donji
Grabovac Gornji
Grabrov
Gračani
Gradac
Grahovljani
Grančari
Granešina
Grašići
Grbci
Grdovčak
Grđevica
Grgurići
Grintavica
Grižane
Grozići
Grubiši
Gruž-luka
Gržančići
Gržani
Gržići
Gučani
Gudalji
Gulići

H

Hlistići
Hobari
Holjevci
Holjevci Jezeranski
Hosti
Hrastilnica
Hrastovica Vivodinska
Hrelići
Hrlići
Humac

I

Istočna Plina
Ivakuša
Ivanci
Ivanušići

J

Jablanac Jasenovački
Jabukovac Donji
Jabukovac Gornji
Jačkovina
Jagodišće
Jagodna
Jakobovac
Jakuševec
Jalševec
Jamarje
Jame
Jankomir
Janjevalj
Jardasi
Jarek Podsusedski
Jargovo
Jarun
Jasik, Croatia
Jašići
Javorja
Jelići, Croatia
Jelkovec
Jelovičani
Jelovka
Jelvica
Jerčinovići
Jezernice
Jezero
Jovanovac, Croatia
Jukinac
Jukini
Jurčevec

K

Kabalna
Kačjak
Kal
Kalanji
Kali
Kalinovica-zavod
Kamenica
Kamenica Brinjska
Kamensko Vrbovsko
Kamenjak
Kanal
Kaniški Vrhovec
Kantrida
Kapan
Kapelica
Kapelska Velika
Kapelšćak
Kapelšćak
Karađorđevo Gradinsko
Karaula
Karin
Kašćergani
Kašina Doljnja
Kašina Gornja
Kaštel
Kaštel
Katići
Katun
Katun
Katun Lindarski
Katun Trviški
Kature
Kavrani
Kičeri
Kistanje Selo
Kladešćica
Klanac Mali
Klanac Veliki
Klanfari
Klapavica Bruvanjska
Klara
Klarići
Klasnić
Klasnić Srednji
Klenik
Kloštar Šiljevički
Klupci
Klupci
Kmačići
Kmeti
Kobiljak 
Kobiljak Sesvetski
Kodolje
Kokanj
Kometnik
Konjarići
Konjci
Kopčić-Brdo
Korenovo
Korensko
Kosanovići
Kosavin
Kosica Skradska
Kostanjek
Kostelj 
Košac
Kotišina
Kotor
Kozo
Kraj
Kraj Gornji
Kraljevec Sesvetski
Krapinica I
Krapinica II
Krasa
Krasnica
Krašovec
Kravlje
Krčevo 
Krči
Kričina
Kričke Donje
Kričke Gornje
Kričke Srednje
Kriva
Krivaja Naseobina
Križišće
Krpani
Krpec
Krtobreg
Kruna
Krvarići
Kuće Donje
Kuće Gornje
Kuhari
Kukar
Kukuruzari
Kula
Kulica
Kunčani
Kupari
Kurilovec
Kurilovec Donji
Kurilovec Gornji
Kustošija
Kutanja
Kuzma
Kuzmići
Kvitrovec

L

Ladvić
Lakoselci
Lamana Draga
Lanka Leševo
Lapad
Lašćina
Laze
Ledine Molvanske
Lekenik Erdedski
Lekenik Turopoljski
Leskovčec
Letina
Lijepa Greda
Linarići
Lipe
Lipnik
Lipovčani
Lipovec
Lipovica
Lisičina
Lištrovac
Loborski Ratkovec
Lokmeri
Lokvica Dramaljska
Lonja Ivanićka
Lonja Kratečka
Lovrinići
Lučane
Lug Dabarski
Lukeži
Lukić Draga
Lukšići
Lupoglav Ledenički

Lj

Ljubljanica

M

Macelj
Mačini
Mačkovec
Majkovac Podravski
Makar
Mala
Mala
Mala Gorica Samoborska
Mala Gorica Turopoljska
Mala Kraska
Mala Londžica
Mala Maslenjača
Mala Polača
Mala Popina
Mala Traba
Male Dražice
Mali Bolč
Mali Brezani
Mali Broćanac
Mali Ježenj
Mali Kozlovčak
Mali Kut
Mali Maj
Mali Prokop
Mali Rastovac
Mali Slatnjak
Mali Škrip
Mali Zdenčac
Malinci
Malo Gaćište
Malo Grablje
Malo Nabrđe
Malo Prljevo
Manestri
Marići
Marići
Marinkovac
Marinović - Brdo
Markci
Martinci Zlatarski
Martinci Zlatarski
Martinska Ves
Marušići
Maslarac
Materada Maj
Matijuci
Matiki
Mavri
Mavrići
Medići
Medvedička
Medvedski Breg
Međugorje Suhopoljsko
Meja
Meja Gaj
Mekinjar
Melnice Hreljinske
Meminska
Merolino Sikirevačko
Miholjački Karlovac
Miholjački Karlovac
Miholjice
Mikulići
Milešine
Milićevo Selo
Milićevo Selo
Milićevo Selo
Milisavci
Milotići
Miroševec
Miroši
Mišljenovići Moravički
Mitrovica Gradinska
Mlinoga
Mlinovi
Mlinska
Močibobi
Mofardini
Moslavački Krivaj
Mošun
Mračaj Zrmanjski

N

Naukovac
Neteča
Noskovići
Nova Brezovica
Nova Cabuna
Nova Gradina
Nova Marča
Novak
Novaki Granešinski
Novaki I
Novaki II 
Novaki Kraljevečki
Novaki Mali
Novaki Veliki
Novaković-gorica
Nove Hiže 
Novi Budakovac
Novi Čakovci
Novi Dol
Novi Kobaš
Novi Kršan
Novi Laminac
Novi Sisak
Novi Zoljan
Novo Selo Lekeničko
Novoselec Granešinski
Nugla

O

Obljaj
Obod
Obor
Obrijež
Obrš
Obršje
Obuljeno
Odvorci
Okrug
Omar
Opatovina
Oporovec
Oprasi
Oraovica
Orašje
Orbanići Gorenji
Orehovica
Orešnjak
Orlići
Orovac Otočki
Otočec Zaprudski
Otok Zaprudski
Otok-Duba
Otrić
Ovčara
Ovčara Suhopoljska

P

Paprata
Pasičina
Pastuša
Pašac
Pašijan
Pauci
Pecka
Pecka Mala
Pecka Velika
Pećca
Pećine
Peljaki
Perinovo
Perjavica
Perkovići Brinjski
Perna Dolnja
Perna Gornja
Pernjak
Petar
Petešljari
Petrinovići
Petrovac Feričanački
Petrovići
Petruševec
Pilepići
Pionirski Grad
Planina
Planjane
Plase (Croatia)
Pleso
Plešivička Reka
Plina
Plišići
Plitvica
Ploče
Ploščica
Plužnice
Podbrezovica
Podbrezovica
Podbrežje
Podgori
Podgorje
Podgorje
Podgrič
Podkuk
Podljut
Podomar 
Podotočje
Podrto
Podskoči
Podsopalj Belgradski
Podsopalj Drivenički
Podsused
Podugrinac
Poduljin 
Podvaroš
Podvoljak
Poljana Breška
Poljane
Polje
Poljice
Poljice
Popov Dol
Popovec
Posert
Prečko
Prigradica
Prisoje
Prizdrina
Prnjarovec
Prokop
Proložac
Prosinja
Prvo Selo
Pučki
Puhari
Puhari
Pulići
Purga Lepoglavska
Purga Pleška
Purgarija
Putari
Pužev Breg
Puži

R

Rabinja
Račak
Radotići
Radovići
Rajakovići
Rajkovići
Rakarje
Raštane
Ravnice
Razvađe Donje
Razvađe Gornje
Razvala
Rebar
Reka Nova
Reka Stara
Reljčevo
Remete (Croatia)
Remetinec Stupnički
Resnički Gaj
Resnik
Retfala Mađarska
Retfala Njemačka
Retkovec
Ribnjača
Ričina
Riđica
Rogočana Vela
Rogolje
Ropci
Rudele u Polju
Rudeš
Ruhci
Rujišta
Runkovci
Ružić Selo
Ružić Veli

S

Sadilovac
Saftići
San Michele
Satrić Gornji
Sela Sesvetska
Selakova Poljana
Selce Dramaljsko
Selišćak
Selišće Letovanićko
Selište
Selnica
Selnica
Selnica Sesvetska
Selnički Vrh
Selno Donje
Selno Donje
Selno Gornje
Selno Gornje
Selo
Semičevići
Senjsko
Seoce
Seoci
Sertići Jezeranski
Sertići Stajnički
Sestranec
Sesvete
Skočibe
Skrbići
Slana Voda
Slanovec
Slatina
Slatinski Lipovac
Slavčići
Smišljak
Smokovo
Smrdelje
Smrka
Sopaljska
Sopnica Sesvetska
Sorbar 
Spagnolli
Spinčići Donji
Spinčići Gornji
Srb
Srbinjak
Srdoči
Srebrenik
Sredina Sela
Srednja Lovča
Srednja Lučelnica
Srednji Borki
Srednji Hrib
Sremac-Ekonomija
Srida Sela
Srida Sela
Srpski Klanac
Sršenik
Sršenovići
Stabljevac
Stanetinski Breg
Stanica Buzet
Stara Brezovica
Stara Gradina
Stari Budakovac
Stari Laminac
Stari Pazin
Stari Sisak
Stari Zoljan
Staro Selo
Staro Selo
Steklice
Stenjevec
Strmice
Strožanac
Struge
Stubica Gomirska
Stupnica
Stupnik
Subocka
Subocki Grad
Sudaraž
Sušak
Sušik
Sušobreg
Sušobreg
Suvaja, Croatia
Sv. Vid
Sveta Jelena Donja
Sveta Jelena Gornja
Sveta Katarina
Sveta Margita
Sveti Franjo
Sveti Jakov
Sveti Juraj na Bregu
Sveti Mikula
Sveti Uldarik
Sveti Vid
Svilno

Š

Šafari
Šajini
Šajn
Šarari
Šaškovec
Šavki
Šćedin
Šebreki
Šegine
Šehovac
Šemnica Radobojska
Šemnica Radobojska
Šestine
Šestinski Kraljevec
Šibrlička
Šijska Kosa
Šiljevica
Šimići
Šimunovec
Šipki Donji
Šipki Donji
Šipki Gornji 
Šipki Gornji
Škabići
Škalić
Škrapna
Špadići
Špansko
Štale
Štefanec Mali
Štefanec Veliki
Štefani
Štefanovec
Štinjan
Štrigovčak
Šumec
Šumećica
Šumetlica
Šupera
Šupljini
Šurani
Šušnjara
Šušnji

T

Taborište
Tepšin Dol
Tijani
Tomičini
Torčec Ludbreški
Trebež
Trebež
Trebišća
Tribalj Gornji
Tribotinj
Trnava
Trnava Resnička
Trnova Poljana
Trnovitica
Trnovo
Trsat
Trstenik
Trtnji
Turčinovići
Turić
Turinovo Selo
Tušići
Tužević

U

Uble
Učka
Ugrini
Ukotići
Umag-Komunela
Ustrine Velike

V

Vagan
Vagan Osredački
Valač
Valle
Varljeni
Varljeni
Varoš
Varoški Vrhovci
Vašanska
Vele Dražice
Veli Ježenj
Veli Maj
Veli Škrip
Velika Londžica
Velika Maslenjača
Velika Polača
Veliki Bolč
Veliki Brezani
Veliki Kozlovčak
Veliki Kut
Veliki Slatnjak
Veliki Strmendolac
Veliki Zdenčac
Veliko Brdo
Veliko Nabrđe
Veliko Prljevo
Veliko Selo
Ves Klenovnička
Ves Lepoglavska
Vezac Donji
Vežica Donja
Vežica Gornja
Vidovec
Vidovec
Vidovec
Viduševac
Vinišće-biskupija
Vinišće-opatija
Vinkovačko Novo Selo
Vinjani
Visoče
Visoki Brijeg
Vitoševo
Vlaška Kapela
Vojvoduša
Volosko 
Vrandolac 
Vranići Kod Poreča
Vrapče
Vrbanec
Vrbanec
Vrbovačko Brdo
Vrbovica
Vrbovsko Gomirsko
Vrh Desne
Vrijeska
Vrnik
Vrtljine
Vučetići 
Vugrovec
Vukelić Draga
Vukojevac
Vukomerec
Vukovje
Vukšinac

Z

Zablaće
Zabrežje
Zadublje
Zagolik
Zagrad Drivenički
Zaile
Zajerci
Zala Draga
Zamaslina
Zamet
Zapadna Plina
Zapolica
Zapolje Dabarsko
Zastene
Završje
Zbitke
Zdenčina
Zebanec
Zlobinsko Brdo
Zoričići

Ž

Žikovci
Žirovac
Žitnjak
Živica
Žižek
Žlebec
Žnjidari
Žugaj
Županje Selo
Županjol Albertinovac

External links
 Državni zavod za statistiku
Sela kojih više nema - U Hrvatskoj nestaje sve više malih mjesta
Hrvatska sela sve modernija, ali i napuštenija
 Napuštena sela - Crtice Hrvatske
http://gradovi-duhova.info/

Ghost towns in Croatia
former